The Festwiese Stadium is a multi-purpose stadium in the Neckarpark event area in the Baden-Württemberg state capital of Stuttgart, Germany in the district of Bad Cannstatt. It is mainly used for training and events in athletics, but is also the home stadium of the American football club AFC Stuttgart Silver Arrows.

References 

Football venues in Germany
American football venues in Germany
Sports venues completed in 1933
1933 establishments in Germany